Vanessa Gidden (born 1 July 1985) is a Jamaican professional basketball player for Quesos El Pastor of La Liga Feminina.

External links
Profile at eurobasket.com

1985 births
Living people
Sportspeople from Kingston, Jamaica
Jamaican women's basketball players
Centers (basketball)
Stamford High School (Stamford, Connecticut) alumni